NASFiC, held in Los Angeles, on Labor Day weekend 1975, at the Los Angeles Airport Marriott, was the first North American Science Fiction Convention. "NASFiC" was an initialism for North American Science Fiction Convention.  This "Continental Convention", the first of its kind, was held because Melbourne, Australia, was selected as the location for the 1975 Worldcon.

Guests of honor
 Harlan Ellison, Guest of Honor
 Lester del Rey, Toastmaster

Information

Site selection
The bid led by Chuck Crayne defeated a bid led by Bruce Pelz, also for Los Angeles in 1975, at an "unofficial" site selection meeting.

Committee
 Chair: Chuck Crayne

Events
Johnny Weissmuller, Buster Crabbe, Jock Mahoney, and James Pierce—four of the actors to have portrayed Tarzan—participated in a "Tarzan Club" reunion as part of a commemoration of the 100th anniversary of Edgar Rice Burroughs' birth. Several of the actresses that have portrayed Jane, including Eve Brent, Joyce MacKenzie, and Louise Lorraine, were also part of the celebration.

Notable program participants

See also
 World Science Fiction Society

References

External links
 NASFiC Official Site

North American Science Fiction Convention
Festivals in Los Angeles
September 1975 events in the United States
1975 in Los Angeles